This is a list of Swiss football transfers for the 2017–18 winter transfer window by club. Only transfers of clubs in the Swiss Super League are included.

Swiss Super League

Basel

In:

Out:

Grasshoppers

In:

Out:

Lausanne-Sport

In:

Out:

Lugano

In:

Out:

Luzern

In:

Out:

Sion

In:

Out:

St. Gallen

In:

Out:

Thun

In:

Out:

Young Boys

In:

Out:

Zürich

In:

Out:

References

Switzerland
Transfers
2017–18